Goos is a commune in France.

Goos may also refer to:

Goos (name), a masculine given name and derived patronymic surname
Goos Lake, in Schleswig-Holstein, Germany
Global Ocean Observing System

See also
Goose (disambiguation)
Goosen, Goossens , other forms of the surname
Goss (disambiguation)